Peter or Piter de Vries may refer to:

Peter De Vries (1910–1993), American editor and novelist
Peter R. de Vries (1956–2021), Dutch crime reporter
Piter De Vries, character from the 1965 science fiction novel Dune